Peter DaCunha (born ) is a Canadian actor best known for his roles as Mason in Home Alone: The Holiday Heist (2012), Remi Vogel in Bruce McDonald's thriller film Hellions (2015) and Tyler in the acclaimed Atom Egoyan drama Remember (2015).

He also participated in the TV show Reign as Prince Charles. He also has a recurring role as Samuel Ramse on Season 2 of the 12 Monkeys television series.

Filmography

Film

Television

References

External links

2003 births
Living people
Canadian male child actors
Male actors from Toronto
Canadian people of Portuguese descent